Youm ou Lila (English: A Day and a Night, French: Une journée et une nuit) is a comedy-drama film directed by Naoufel Berraoui and released in October 2013.

Synopsis 
The film tells the story of Izza, a mother from the Souss countryside, and the difficulties she faces in caring for her seriously ill daughter. Every month, her husband Hussein sends a parcel to his family containing medicine for his daughter. When he once forgets to do so, endangering the life of his child, Izza - who has never left her native countryside - decides to make a long journey to Casablanca in search of her husband. She meets Aziza, a prostitute who will help her. The journey will last one day and one night, hence the title of the film.

Cast 

 Touria Alaoui
 Majdouline Drissi
 Omar Lotfi
 Machmoum
 Abdelghani Snak 
 Youssef Ouzellal

References

External links 
 

2013 comedy-drama films
2013 films
2010s Arabic-language films
Moroccan comedy-drama films